In music, a chorale monody was a type of a sacred composition of the very early German Baroque era.  It was for solo voice and accompanying instruments, usually basso continuo, and was closely related to the contemporary Italian style of monody.  Almost all examples of chorale monodies were written in the first half of the 17th century.

A chorale monody used the text of a chorale, but rarely if ever used the chorale tune, at least not in a recognizable form.  It was also related to the concertato madrigal, another contemporary Italian form. While the vocal part in Schein's early examples of the genre retained the rhythmic and melodic flexibility of the Italian monody, he replaced the rhythmically vague bass lines of his model with a stricter rhythmic beat in the instrumental accompaniment. The chorale monody formed the basis for the later development of the solo cantata.

Composers 

Composers of chorale monodies included:
Christoph Bernhard
Andreas Hammerschmidt
Johann Erasmus Kindermann
Sebastian Knüpfer
Tobias Michael
Johann Hermann Schein
Johann Schelle
Heinrich Schütz
Thomas Selle
Johann Staden
Franz Tunder
Matthias Weckmann

References

Works cited

Further reading 
 
 Marshall, Robert L., revised by Robin A. Leaver (2001). "Chorale settings". The New Grove Dictionary of Music and Musicians, second edition, edited by Stanley Sadie and John Tyrrell. London: Macmillan Publishers. iv:323–338.

Baroque music
German music history
Classical church music